Eduard Ramazanovich Gatiyev (born 3 March 1978) is a former Russian professional footballer.

Honours
 Belarusian Premier League runner-up: 2007.

External links
 

1978 births
Living people
Russian footballers
Association football defenders
FC Lada-Tolyatti players
FC Gomel players
FC Shakhtyor Soligorsk players
FC SKVICH Minsk players
Belarusian Premier League players
Russian expatriate footballers
Expatriate footballers in Belarus